The year 2021 in Afghanistan was marked by a major offensive from the Taliban beginning in May and the Taliban capturing Kabul in August.

Incumbents

Events

January
1 January – Journalist and human rights activist Bismillah Aimaq is shot dead in the province of Ghor.
5 January – Afghan delegates meet with Taliban leaders in Doha, Qatar, to reopen peace talks.

February

March
30 March – Three polio vaccine workers are killed by gunmen in Jalalabad, Nangarhar Province.

April
13 April – President of United States Joe Biden announces plans to withdraw U.S troops from Afghanistan by 11 September.
30 April – At least 30 are killed, and more than 90 are wounded by an explosion outside a guesthouse in Puli Alam, Logar Province.

May
1 May – The 2021 Taliban offensive begins.
2 May – The Taliban threatens further attacks as the deadline for withdrawal passes 1 May, when previous US President Donald Trump said US forces would withdraw from Afghanistan.
6 May 
 High-profile Afghan reporter Newat Rawan is shot dead by an unidentified assailant in Kandahar.
 Taliban fighters capture Afghanistan's second largest dam and key army bases as their insurgency intensifies across the country.
8 May – A car bomb and two other improvised explosive devices explode outside a secondary school in the Dashte Barchi neighborhood in western Kabul, killing at least 68 people, most of whom were students.
14 May – At least 12 worshippers are killed when a ISIL-KP bomb explodes inside a mosque in Kabul.

June
1 June – Multiple explosions targeting ethnic Hazaras killed at least 12.
8 June – The government announces that the COVID-19 pandemic situation in the country is under control.
17 June – The Taliban capture Dawlat Abad District, killing at least 24 Afghan commandos and five police officers in the process.
30 June – The Taliban capture 700 trucks and Humvees from the Afghan National Army as more districts fall under the group's control during their offensive in the north.

July
2 July – Germany and Italy withdraw their troops from Afghanistan. U.S. troops leave Bagram Airfield, handing it to the Afghan Armed Forces.
3 July – More than 1,000 Afghan border guards and soldiers cross the state border with Tajikistan to flee from Taliban forces. According to Tajik authorities Hohon, Shahri Buzurg and Rogiston county of Badakhshan Province fell to the Taliban. Tajik forces allow the retreating Afghan servicemen to cross into their territory.
22 July – At least 100 people are massacred in a mass shooting in Spin Boldak District, Kandahar Province.

August
3 August – A suspected Taliban suicide car bomber and gunmen attack the house of Afghan Defence Minister Bismillah Khan Mohammadi, killing 13 people, including five attackers. Mohammadi was unharmed in the attack.
6 August – Zaranj, the capital of Nimruz, is captured by Taliban insurgents after fierce fighting in the region.
 7 August – The Taliban seizes Sheberghan, the capital of Jowzjan Province.
 8 August – Taliban capture provincial capital of Sar-e-Pol, Kunduz and Taloqan as fighting rages across the country.
 9 August – Taliban fighters seize provincial capital of Aybak.
 10 August – Taliban fighters capture provincial capitals of Farah and Puli Khumri.
 11 August
 Afghan government replaces army chief General Wali Mohammad.
 President Ashraf Ghani fly to Mazar-i-Sharif and holds talks with local Uzbeks and Tajiks figures.
 Fayzabad, capital of Badakhshan Province, is seized by the Taliban.
 12 August – Taliban capture provincial capital of Ghazni. Afghanistan's third largest city, Herat, also fell to the insurgents. The group later seizes the country's second-largest city, Kandahar.
 13 August 
 Capital of Helmand Province, Lashkar Gah, fell to the Taliban. The insurgents also captured Qalati Ghilji, Terenkot, Puli Alam, Feruz Koh and Qal-e-Naw. As of 13 August, a total of 18 provincial capitals have been seized by the Taliban.
 Finland, Denmark and Switzerland announced plans to withdraw their consulate workers amidst advancing Taliban fighters.
 United Kingdom announces Operation Pitting which goal is to evacuate its citizens out of Afghanistan.
 14 August
 President Ashraf Ghani addresses the nation as the Taliban makes rapid gains.
 United States announces that it will deploy 3,000 troops to Afghanistan to help with the evacuation process from the country. Additional 5,000 troops will also be deployed. 
 Mazar-i-Sharif, the last anti-Taliban stronghold in Northern Afghanistan, is captured by the Taliban, signifying the near collapse of Afghan government control in the north.  Taliban also capture the provincial capital of Asadabad, Gardez, Maymana, Mihtarlam, Nili and Sharana. More than half of the country's provinces have been seized by the insurgents. 
 15 August
As the Taliban advances to Kabul, incumbent Afghan President Ashraf Ghani decided to flee the country.
Taliban captures Kabul with little resistance, marking the beginning of Taliban rule over Afghanistan.
 16 August - At least seven people are killed after thousands flocked to Kabul's Hamid Karzai International Airport in an attempt to flee from Taliban rule of Afghanistan. 
 17 August - Incumbent Afghan Vice President Amrullah Saleh declares himself as caretaker president of Afghanistan and set up a resistance in Panjshir Province, the last government-controlled Afghan province.
 26 August
2021 Kabul airport attack – Explosion go off on gates outside Hamid Karzai International Airport. At least 182 are killed, and at least 150 are injured.
The Panjshir conflict has a ceasefire after 10 days.
29 August - U.S. army launches drone strike at a residential area in Kabul following reports of a possible terrorist attack in Kabul Airport, killing ten people, including seven children.
30 August
The last American military plane evacuates Maj. Gen. Chris Donahue, commander of the US Army 82nd Airborne Division, and officially ends 20 years of American military involvement in Afghanistan.

September
 4 September 
 Taliban announces victory over Panjshir Valley, claims full control of Afghanistan.
 At least 17 deaths and 40 injuries are reported due to the Taliban's celebratory gunfire following the announcement of the Taliban's victory over Panjshir.
 Panjshir rebels deny Taliban claim over the rebel-held region.
 7 September 
 Chief spokesman of Taliban announces list of cabinet members for the new caretaker government of Afghanistan. Prominent Talib figure Mohammad Hasan Akhund is appointed as the head of the government.
 11 September - Flag of Islamic Emirate of Afghanistan is raised for the first time since 2001.
 12 September - Taliban announces gender segregation and new dress code in schools and educational institutions.

October
 8 October - 2021 Kunduz mosque bombing
 15 October - 2021 Kandahar bombing

Timelines 

 List of 2021 Afghanistan attacks

See also

 2021 Taliban offensive
 History of Afghanistan
 Outline of Afghanistan
 Politics of Afghanistan
 Government of Afghanistan
 COVID-19 pandemic in Afghanistan
 2020s in political history

References

 
Afghanistan
Afghanistan
2020s in Afghanistan
Years of the 21st century in Afghanistan